Uhleriola is a genus of dirt-colored seed bugs in the family Rhyparochromidae. There is one described species in Uhleriola, U. floralis.

References

External links

 

Rhyparochromidae
Articles created by Qbugbot
Pentatomomorpha genera
Monotypic Hemiptera genera